Nicole Léger (born March 12, 1955) is a former Canadian politician and the former Member of the National Assembly of Quebec (MNA) for the riding of Pointe-aux-Trembles from 1996 to 2006 and elected back as member of the Parti Québécois in a by-election on May 12, 2008, serving until the 2018 Quebec provincial election.

Background

She was born on March 12, 1955, in Montreal, Quebec, and is the daughter of former Parti Québécois MNA Marcel Léger and the sister of Jean-Marc Léger, president of Léger Marketing. She made career in education and served in various executive positions in the Parti Québécois (PQ) from 1970 to 1996.

Member of the National Assembly

Following the death of MNA Michel Bourdon, Léger ran as a PQ candidate to fill his seat of Pointe-aux-Trembles.  She easily won the by-election with 47% of the vote and was re-elected in the 1998 election.

Cabinet Member

Léger was appointed to the Cabinet in 1998 and served as Minister responsible for Family Services until 2001 and as Minister responsible for the War against Poverty from 2001 to 2003.

Retirement from politics

She won re-election in the 2003 election, but her party was defeated by Jean Charest's Liberals.

In the Parti Québécois leadership election of 2005 she was a staunch supporter of Pauline Marois over André Boisclair.

In the aftermath of Boisclair's victory as leader, both Marois and Léger vacated their seats and left politics.  André Boisclair won a by-election and succeeded Nicole Léger as the MNA for Pointe-aux-Trembles.

Political comeback

Even though Boisclair won re-election to the legislature in the 2007 election, the PQ had one of the worst showings in history.  Boisclair resigned as party leader and relinquished his seat.

Léger won the seat back on May 12, 2008: she received 55% of the vote in a by-election and finished ahead of candidates Mélissa Dumais of the Liberal Party and Diane Bellemare of the ADQ.

She did not seek re-election in the 2018 Quebec provincial election.

Electoral record (partial)

Footnotes

References

1955 births
Women government ministers of Canada
French Quebecers
Living people
Members of the Executive Council of Quebec
Parti Québécois MNAs
Politicians from Montreal
Women MNAs in Quebec
21st-century Canadian politicians
21st-century Canadian women politicians